Xinshiba is a town in Ganluo County, Sichuan Province, China. In June 2020, Like Township, Aer Township, and Shihai Township were abolished, and the former administrative areas of Like Township, Tie'er'mo Village, and Xixiga Village were placed under the jurisdiction of Xinshiba.

Administrative divisions
As of 2022, Xinshiba administers the following 5 residential communities and 18 villages:
 Chengbei Residential Community
 Chengnan Residential Community
 Chengxi Residential Community
 Chengdong Residential Community
 Hedong Residential Community
 Xinmin Village
 Erjue Village
 Ajiayi Village
 Muguzu Village
 La'er Village
 Zegou Village
 Luge Village
 Yizhi Village
 Liugu Village
 Jiagu Village
 Houyupu Village
 Teji Village
 Yimin New Village
 Xixiga Village
 Jushen Village
 Bala Village
 Naituo Village
 Yanrun'afa Village

References 

Ganluo County
Towns in Sichuan